The 2012–13 Saint Louis Billikens men's basketball team represented Saint Louis University in the 2012–13 NCAA Division I men's basketball season. The Billikens' head coach Rick Majerus was to sit the season out for health concerns while Jim Crews served as the interim head coach.  Majerus died on December 1, 2012. The team played their home games at Chaifetz Arena. They were a member of the Atlantic 10 Conference. They finished the season 28–7, 13–3 in A-10 play to win the regular season conference championship. They were also champions of the Atlantic 10 tournament, defeating VCU in the championship game, to earn the conference's automatic bid to the 2013 NCAA tournament where they defeated New Mexico State in the second round before losing in the third round to Oregon.

Roster

Schedule

|-
!colspan=12| Exhibition

|-
!colspan=12| Regular season

|-
!colspan=12|2013 Atlantic 10 tournament

|-
!colspan=12|2013 NCAA tournament

Rankings

Preseason
The Billikens garnered buzz as one of the preseason favorites to win their conference.  "[T]he only major loss is 6-foot-6 forward Brian Conklin, the team's leading scorer. But everyone else of note -- point guard Kwamain Mitchell, off-guards Mike McCall and Jordair Jett, swingman Dwayne Evans, forward Cody Ellis -- is back. Meanwhile, 6-11 forward Rob Loe looks capable of stepping into a bigger role in the frontcourt in his junior season."

Departures

References

Saint Louis
Saint Louis Billikens men's basketball seasons
Saint Louis
Saint
Saint